Andersonia may refer to:
Andersonia, California, a community in Mendocino County
Andersonia (fish), a genus of loach catfish containing the single species Andersonia leptura 
Andersonia (plant), a genus of plants in the family Ericaceae
Andersonia, a former genus in the family Rubiaceae that has been synonymized with Gaertnera
Stylidium subg. Andersonia, a subgenus of Stylidium
Stylidium sect. Andersonia, a section of Stylidium